Merseylea is a locality and small rural community in the local government areas of Kentish and Latrobe in the North West region of Tasmania.
The 2016 census determined a population of 56 for the state suburb of Merseylea.

History
Merseylea was gazetted as a locality in 1965.

Geography
The Mersey River forms the south-eastern boundary before flowing through to the north-west where it forms part of the north-western boundary. The Western Rail Line runs through from south to north-west.

Road infrastructure
The B13 route (Railton Road) passes along the south-west boundary and through the southern end of the locality. Route C154 (Merseylea Road) starts at an intersection with B13 and runs through from south-west to north. Route C156 (Bridle Track Road) starts at an intersection with B13 and immediately exits to the south-west.

References

Localities of Kentish Council
Localities of Latrobe Council
Towns in Tasmania